The Estonian Women's Curling Championship is the national championship of women's curling teams in Estonia. It has been held annually since the 2004–2005 season, and is organized by the Estonian Curling Association.

List of champions and medallists
Team line-ups shows in order: fourth, third, second, lead, alternate (if exists), coach (if exists); skips marked bold.

Medal record for skips
(as of 2021; placement for skips only)

See also
Estonian Men's Curling Championship
Estonian Mixed Curling Championship
Estonian Mixed Doubles Curling Championship

References

Curling competitions in Estonia
Recurring sporting events established in 2005
2005 establishments in Estonia
National curling championships
National championships in Estonia